Pavel Fořt (born 26 June 1983) is a retired Czech footballer.

Career 
Fořt left Slavia Prague for Toulouse. On 24 January 2007, he played his first Ligue 1 match against Nice. On 16 January 2009, he joined Slavia Prague on loan and on 14 July 2009 signed with Arminia Bielefeld. Two years later, after Bielefeld's relegation to the 3. Liga, he signed for Dynamo Dresden, who had been promoted to the 2. Bundesliga.

References

External links
 
 

1983 births
Living people
Czech footballers
Czech Republic youth international footballers
Czech Republic under-21 international footballers
Czech expatriate footballers
Czech expatriate sportspeople in France
Czech expatriate sportspeople in Belgium
Czech expatriate sportspeople in Germany
Czech expatriate sportspeople in Slovakia
Expatriate footballers in France
Expatriate footballers in Belgium
Expatriate footballers in Germany
Expatriate footballers in Slovakia
FC Viktoria Plzeň players
SK Slavia Prague players
Toulouse FC players
R.W.D.M. Brussels F.C. players
Arminia Bielefeld players
Dynamo Dresden players
ŠK Slovan Bratislava players
1. FK Příbram players
Czech First League players
Belgian Pro League players
Ligue 1 players
2. Bundesliga players
Slovak Super Liga players
Sportspeople from Plzeň
Association football forwards